

Notes

References

See also
List of monastic houses in Ireland

Monastic houses
Monastic houses
Antrim
Monastic houses